This is a list of islands of Panama.

Caribbean Sea 
Bocas del Toro Archipelago
Isla Bastimentos
Cayos Zapatilla
Isla Carenero
Isla Cayo Agua
Isla Colon
Isla Cristóbal
Isla Popa
Isla Solarte
Isla Escudo de Veraguas
Galeta Island
Isla Cabra
Isla Mamey
Isla Grande
San Blas Islands
Corazón de Jesús
Narganá
Soledad Miria

Pacific Ocean 
Gulf of Chiriqui Islands
Isla Boca Brava
Isla Boca Chica
Isla Parida
Isla Palenque
Isla Sevilla
Islas Secas
 Cayo de Agua
 Isla Montuosa
 Jicarón
 Coiba
 Cébaco
 Islas Frailes
 Isla Gobernadora
 Isla Leones
Taborcillo
 Isla Verde
Gulf of Panama Islands
 Farallon (Cliff)
 Isla Iguana - Pedasi - Azuero
Panama Bay Islands (Panama Bay is part of the Gulf of Panama)
Causeway Islands
Otoque
Taboga
Taboguilla
Archipelago Las Perlas (or Pearl Islands)
Isla Bolano
Isla Bayoneta
Isla de Boyarena
Isla Buena Vista
Isla Cañas
Isla Casaya
Isla Casayeta
Isla Chapera
Isla Chitre
Isla Cocos
Isla Contadora
Isla del Rey
Isla Espirito Santos
Isla Galera
Isla Gallo
Isla Gibraleon
Isla José
Isla la Mina
Isla Lampon
Isla Mogo Mogo
Isla Monte
Isla Pacheca
Isla Pachequille
Isla Pedro González
Isla Pericote
Isla Puerco
Isla Saboga
Isla San Blas
Isla San Jose
Isla Senora
Isla San Telmo
Isla Vivenda
Isla Viveros

Lake Gatun 
Isla Barro Colorado
Isla Gatun
Isla Tres Perros

See also
 Geography of Panama

References 

Islands
Panama